The 1924 Atlantic hurricane season featured the earliest known Category 5 hurricane – a tropical cyclone with maximum sustained winds exceeding . The first system, Tropical Storm One, was first detected in the northwestern Caribbean Sea on June 18. The final system, an unnumbered tropical depression, dissipated on November 24. These dates fall within the period with the most tropical cyclone activity in the Atlantic. Of the 13 tropical cyclones of the season, six existed simultaneously. The season was average with 11 tropical storms, five of which strengthened into hurricanes. Further, two of those five intensified into major hurricanes, which are Category 3 or higher on the Saffir–Simpson hurricane wind scale.

The most significant storm of the season was Hurricane Ten, nicknamed the 1924 Cuba hurricane. It struck western Cuba as a Category 5 hurricane, before weakening and making landfall in Florida as a Category 1 hurricane. Severe damage and 90 fatalities were collectively reported at both locations. Another system, Hurricane Four, brought strong winds and flooding to the Leeward Islands. The storm left 59 deaths, 30 of which were on Montserrat alone. Several other tropical cyclones impacted land, including Tropical Storms One, Eight, and Ten, as well as Hurricanes Three and Five, and the remnants of Hurricane Three and Four. Overall, the storms of the 1924 Atlantic hurricane season collectively caused at least 179 fatalities.

The season's activity was reflected with an accumulated cyclone energy (ACE) rating of 100, above the 1921–1930 average of 76.6. ACE is a metric used to express the energy used by a tropical cyclone during its lifetime. Therefore, a storm with a longer duration will have high values of ACE. Thus, tropical depressions are not included here.

Timeline

Systems

Tropical Storm One 

It made landfall on northern Belize with estimated winds near . Pressures were progressively decreasing over the preceding days in the northwestern Caribbean Sea. The tropical system crossed the Yucatán Peninsula, emerging over the Bay of Campeche on June 19 with  winds. It dissipated over land. The cyclone was classified as a weak disturbance, and strong winds were not recorded throughout the life span of the storm. Squalls affected the Texas coast, prompting advisories for small watercraft. Heavy rainfall was reported in Mexico.

Tropical Storm Two 

Toward the end of July, a decaying cold front off the east coast of Florida resulted in the formation of a tropical storm, which possessed some hybrid cyclone characteristics. Later it weakened over colder sea surface temperatures. On July 30, it was absorbed by a cold front to the south of Nova Scotia.

Hurricane Three 

It moved northwest and crossed the eastern Caribbean as a minimal tropical storm on August 18. It passed east of San Juan, Puerto Rico and re-entered the Atlantic Ocean on August 9. It quickly strengthened, reaching hurricane status by the following day. The cyclone slowed and turned west on August 21, and it continued to strengthen east of the northern Bahamas. At the time, the storm was nearly stationary. The cyclone turned sharply north, remaining offshore the East Coast of the United States. On August 25, it quickly weakened, and it passed close to Cape Hatteras on August 26. It transitioned to an extratropical cyclone, before passing over Nova Scotia on August 27.

The approach of the storm led to the issuance of storm warnings from Miami, Florida, to Cape Hatteras, North Carolina on August 22. Hurricane warnings extended from Beaufort, North Carolina, to Cape Henry, Virginia. In advance of the storm, radio broadcasts also advised shipping interests to remain cautious north of Puerto Rico. No damages occurred along the coast because of the recurving storm. Peak wind gusts reached  at Hatteras, North Carolina, and two people drowned along the coast. Damage was minimal, though Ocracoke Island was flooded during the storm. The White Star passenger liner  was battered by the storm on August 26 while the ship was off the Nantucket Shoals. The ship arrived in New York the following day with 75 injured after having what was reported as a "100-foot wave" crash over the liner. The remnants of the hurricane caused severe damage to electrical and telegraph lines and trees in Atlantic Canada, especially in Nova Scotia. Offshore, maritime incidents relating to the storm resulted in the drownings of 26 people after their schooners capsized.

August tropical depression 
On August 22, a strong tropical wave merged into the Atlantic from the west coast of Africa and quickly developed into a tropical depression later that day. However, because no other gale-force winds were observed, the depression was not upgraded to a tropical storm by the Atlantic hurricane reanalysis project in 2009. The depression moved northwestward through the Cape Verde Islands but likely dissipated on August 23.

Hurricane Four 

Initially, it moved west on August 26. On August 27, it turned west-northwest and intensified as it approached the Lesser Antilles. It strengthened to a hurricane on August 28 and crossed Cudjoe Head on the island of Montserrat. The cyclone turned northwest, crossing the northeastern Caribbean near Anguilla on August 29.

The cyclone recurved northward on September 2 and weakened to the equivalent of a Category 1 hurricane on September 3. The storm lost tropical characteristics on September 4, but retained hurricane-force winds when it struck Nova Scotia on September 5. In the Virgin Islands, the cyclone destroyed hundreds of homes and severely damaged crops. Several deaths were reported. Heavy precipitation caused flooding on several islands in the path of the storm. On Saint Thomas, small boats were wrecked and trees were uprooted by the winds. More than 6,000 people were homeless on Montserrat, while 30 were dead and 200 received wounds. Damages were estimated near £100,000 on the island. The Red Cross donated $3,000 and fed victims after the storm. In total, damages reached £86,000 and at least 59 people were killed in the Leeward Islands. Offshore Newfoundland, at least two people drowned and ten others were reported as missing after they abandoned their schooner.

Hurricane Five 

It moved northwest, quickly strengthening to a hurricane on September 13. Late on September 14, the cyclone turned northeast, and it struck the Florida Panhandle near Port St. Joe on September 15. The hurricane quickly weakened to a tropical storm as it moved inland, crossing southern Georgia on September 16. It entered the Atlantic Ocean near Savannah, Georgia, with winds near . The storm accelerated east-northeastward, becoming extratropical off Cape Hatteras on September 17. The system was last detected on September 19 south of Newfoundland.

In Florida, minor damage to properties was reported. Wind gusts reached  in Port St. Joe. Two fishing vessels were blown ashore in the area, while a schooner was wrecked near Carrabelle. Advance warnings reduced the potential damages in northwest Florida. In Georgia, heavy precipitation caused two deaths and significant crop damage. Most of Brownton, Georgia was destroyed by floods. Gale-force winds also occurred along the Eastern Seaboard, though warnings were released in advance of the winds. Operationally, the cyclone was not believed to have attained hurricane intensity. The hurricane was generally unexpected in the Tampa, Florida, area. In Nova Scotia, the remnants of the cyclone dropped  of precipitation in Halifax, one of the heaviest rainfall episodes in that municipality in 1927.

Tropical Storm Six 

On September 20, a weak tropical storm was observed over the islands of Cape Verde. It tracked slowly northwestward through the archipelago. Ship observations were sparse in tracking the storm; it was last observed on September 22.

Tropical Storm Seven 

It is estimated a tropical depression formed south of the Cape Verde islands on September 24. It moved generally west-northwestward and slowly intensified. The storm weakened and later re-intensified to the same peak intensity on October 2. It became extratropical on October 3, while turning northeastward. The remnants were absorbed by a larger extratropical storm on October 5.

Tropical Storm Eight 

Low pressures were reported in the northwestern Caribbean Sea from September 23 through September 27. On the latter day, a minimal tropical storm formed over the southwestern Caribbean Sea east of Roatán, Honduras. On September 28, the cyclone moved northward and slowly intensified, passing east of Cozumel. It quickly accelerated northeast and transitioned to an extratropical system with  winds. Later, it entered the Big Bend of Florida near Cedar Key. On September 30, it rapidly moved northeast across the coastal Southeastern United States. It was last detected near Norfolk, Virginia. Storm warnings were released for the eastern Gulf Coast of the United States on September 29, advising residents to prepare for gale-force winds. Warnings were also issued from Jacksonville, Florida, to Fort Monroe, Virginia. Eventually, warnings also encompassed the Mid-Atlantic and Northeastern United States. Gale-force winds affected the East Coast of the United States.

Tropical Storm Nine 

The pattern that led to the formation of this system led to a significant heavy rainfall event in eastern Florida, which experienced prolonged easterly flow within its northeastern periphery. Between October 4 and October 11,  fell at New Smyrna. It moved quickly southwest and weakened to a minimal tropical storm on October 13. The system weakened to a tropical depression on October 14 and dissipated over the southwestern Gulf of Mexico the following day. Operationally, the system was classified as a moderate disturbance.

Hurricane Ten 

The Great Cuba Hurricane of 1924 

Late on October 13, a minimal tropical storm formed in the western Caribbean Sea east-northeast of northern Honduras. The storm moved slowly west-northwest and gradually turned north on October 15. Later that day, it steadily intensified, attaining hurricane intensity on October 17. It strengthened to the equivalent of a major hurricane on October 19. On October 20, the hurricane turned east-northeast in response to the southward movement of a ridge. It quickly weakened and made landfall in Southwest Florida near Naples, Florida as a Category 1 hurricane. The storm entered the Atlantic Ocean north of Miami with  winds. The cyclone steadily weakened as it moved across the western Atlantic Ocean, before dissipating west-southwest of Bermuda on October 23.

In Cuba, at least 90 people were killed. The hurricane produced severe damage to crops and buildings across western Cuba, injuring 50–100 people in Arroyos de Mantua. In Florida, watercraft were secured and trees were trimmed in anticipation of the storm. Peak wind gusts reached  in Key West, where damage to vegetation was minimal. The rains caused flooding in Palm Beach County, disrupting traffic on highways and railroads. Telegraph wires were disabled in Fort Myers and Punta Gorda, though damages were minimal.

Hurricane Eleven 

The system moved northward with winds of minimal intensity, and it struck Clarendon Parish, Jamaica on November 7 with  sustained winds. Early on November 8, it left the northern coast of the island, and it strengthened prior to making landfall west of Santiago de Cuba on November 9. Later, the cyclone strengthened to a hurricane as it entered the Atlantic Ocean, and it turned northeast over the Turks and Caicos Islands on November 10. The hurricane accelerated while heading away from the Turks and Caicos Islands on November 11. The system passed east of Bermuda and weakened to a tropical storm on November 14. It quickly became extratropical and was last reported on November 15.

November tropical depression 
Historic weather maps and observations from ships indicate that a tropical depression formed in the southwestern Caribbean on November 23. The depression tracked westward and organized further, though the highest sustained wind speed observed in relation to the system was  By November 24, the depression dissipated.

See also 

 List of tropical cyclones
 Atlantic hurricane season
 1900–1940 South Pacific cyclone seasons
 1900–1950 South-West Indian Ocean cyclone seasons
 1920s Australian region cyclone seasons

References

External links 

 Monthly Weather Review
 Unisys tracking data for 1924
 

 
Articles which contain graphical timelines
1924 meteorology
1924 natural disasters